Monia zelandica, is a species of marine bivalve mollusc in the family Anomiidae, the jingle shells.

References
 Powell A W B, New Zealand Mollusca, William Collins Publishers Ltd, Auckland, New Zealand 1979 

Anomiidae
Bivalves of Australia
Bivalves of New Zealand
Bivalves described in 1843
Taxa named by John Edward Gray